Jorge Coll Arencibia (born 19 December 1968) is a Cuban handball coach of the Cuban national team.

He coached the Cuban team at the 2019 World Women's Handball Championship.

References

1968 births
Living people
Handball coaches of international teams
Cuban handball coaches
Place of birth missing (living people)
21st-century Cuban people